Lucius Shepard (August 21, 1943 – March 18, 2014) was an American writer. Classified as a science fiction and fantasy writer, he often leaned into other genres, such as magical realism.

Career
Shepard was a native of Lynchburg, Virginia where he was born in 1943. His first short stories appeared in 1983, and his first novel, Green Eyes, appeared in 1984. At the time, he was considered part of the cyberpunk movement. Shepard came to writing late, having first enjoyed a varied career, including a stint playing rock and roll in the Midwest and extensive travel throughout Europe and Asia. Algis Budrys, reviewing Green Eyes, praised Shepard's "ease of narrative style that comes only from a profound love and respect for the language and the literatures that have graced it."

Lucius Shepard has won several awards for his science fiction: in 1985 he won John W. Campbell Award for best new writer, followed in 1986 with a best novella Nebula Award for his story "R&R", which later became part of his 1987 novel Life During Wartime. This novel won the Kurd-Laßwitz-Preis in 1990. His novella "Barnacle Bill the Spacer" won a Hugo in 1993. His poem "White Trains" won the Rhysling Award in 1988. Two early collections of short stories won the World Fantasy Award for best collection: The Jaguar Hunter in 1988 and The Ends of the Earth Collection in 1992.  His novella "Vacancy" won a Shirley Jackson Award in 2008.

Lucius Shepard resided in Portland, Oregon.

Themes and evolution

Shepard embraced many different themes throughout his career. In his early work, he wrote extensively about Central America. This included clearly science-fictional stories about near future high-tech jungle war (such as "R&R" and "Salvador"), as well as stories that seemed more in line with magic realism. Many of these, such as "Black Coral" (which concerns an American living on an island off of Honduras) and "The Jaguar Hunter" (the story of a man whose wife's debt forces him to hunt a mythical black jaguar, which his people consider sacred), explore cultural clashes. Shepard traveled extensively in Central America and lived there for a time.

Shepard stopped writing fiction for much of the 1990s. He returned near the end of that decade, producing such works as the novella Radiant Green Star, which won a Locus Award for Best Novella in 2001. Though he still wrote Central American fiction, Shepard's interest seemed to be moving north: he published two short novels, "A Handbook of American Prayer" and "Viator", both set in North America. On that same note, he published many works where culture and geography were secondary (his novella "Jailwise" is a prime example), preferring to focus on wider questions such as the role of justice in society.

Much of Shepard's later work was non-fiction. He researched the Freight Train Riders of America and spent time riding the rails, writing both fiction and non-fiction based on those experiences. He was also a regular movie reviewer for The Magazine of Fantasy & Science Fiction and electricstory.com. His reviews are marked by general contempt for the current state of American film.

According to fellow author James Patrick Kelly, Shepard was an avid sports fan who has often used dramatic sports moments as inspiration to write.

In the summer of 2008, Shepard moved to Neuchatel, Switzerland in order to work on several screenplays. He served on the jury of the Neuchâtel International Fantastic Film Festival (NIFFF) with the American director Joe Dante.

He died in March 2014 at the age of 70 of complications from a stroke.

Bibliography

Novels

Short fiction 
Collections
 
 
 
 
 
 
 
 
 
 
 
 
 
 
 
 
 
 
Stories

Poetry 

Chapbooks
 
List of poems

Non-fiction

Film reviews

Comics

Critical studies and reviews of Shepard's work
 
 
 

Five autobiographies and a fiction
 
———————
Notes

Work available online

The Jaguar Hunter

The Night of White Bhairab

References

External links 

 
A more complete bibliography
Golden Gryphon Press official site - About Louisiana Breakdown
Golden Gryphon Press official site - About Two Trains Running
Golden Gryphon Press official site - About The Golden (trade paperback reprint)

1943 births
2014 deaths
20th-century American male writers
20th-century American novelists
20th-century American short story writers
21st-century American male writers
21st-century American novelists
21st-century American short story writers
American fantasy writers
American horror writers
American male novelists
American male short story writers
American science fiction writers
Asimov's Science Fiction people
Hugo Award-winning writers
John W. Campbell Award for Best New Writer winners
The Magazine of Fantasy & Science Fiction people
Nebula Award winners
Novelists from Virginia
Rhysling Award for Best Long Poem winners
World Fantasy Award-winning writers
Writers from Lynchburg, Virginia
Weird fiction writers